Christine Kim may refer to:

 Christine Y. Kim, art curator
 Christine Sun Kim, American sound artist